German campaign may refer to:
 Roman campaigns in Germania (12 BC – AD 16)
 German and Sarmatian campaigns of Constantine
German Campaign of 1813
 German campaign in Angola, 1914–15
 Western Allied invasion of Germany, 1945
 Soviet invasion of Germany, 1945